Um Sang-back (Hangul: 엄상백; born October 4, 1996 in Seoul) is a South Korean pitcher for the KT Wiz in the Korea Baseball Organization (KBO).

References 

KT Wiz players
KBO League pitchers
South Korean baseball players
1996 births
Living people